Peter Mullan (born 2 November 1959) is a Scottish actor and filmmaker. He is best known for his role in Ken Loach's My Name Is Joe (1998), for which he won Best Actor Award at 1998 Cannes Film Festival, 2000's The Claim and all three series of the BBC comedy series Mum, in which he starred as Michael. He is also winner of the World Dramatic Special Jury Prize for Breakout Performances at 2011 Sundance Film Festival for his work on Paddy Considine's Tyrannosaur (2011). Mullan has appeared as supporting or guest actor in numerous cult movies, including Riff-Raff (1991), Braveheart (1995), Trainspotting (1996), Session 9 (2002), Young Adam (2003), Children of Men (2006), the final two Harry Potter films (2010–11), and War Horse (2011).

Mullan is an art house movie director. He won a Golden Lion at 59th Venice International Film Festival for The Magdalene Sisters (2002), listed by many critics among the best films of 2003 and nominated for BAFTA Award for Best British Film and European Film Award for best film, and a Golden Shell at San Sebastián International Film Festival for Neds (2010). He is the only person to win top prizes both for acting (Cannes Best Actor award for My Name Is Joe) and for the best film (Golden Lion for The Magdalene Sisters) at major European film festivals.

In television, he played a lead role in the 2008 ITV series The Fixer. Mullan appeared in Gerard Lee's and Jane Campion's 2013 miniseries Top of the Lake as Matt Mitcham, head of the Mitcham family and father of Tui Mitcham, whose disappearance is the main topic of the series. He was nominated for a Primetime Emmy Award for his work in the series. From 2016 to 2019, he starred in the BBC Two sitcom Mum, and from 2017 to 2018, Mullan appeared in the first two seasons of the Netflix series Ozark. In 2018 and 2020, he starred in the second and third season of HBO's Westworld in a recurring and guest capacity respectively. Also in 2020, he starred in the first season of the Netflix series Cursed.

Early life
Mullan was born on 2 November 1959 in Peterhead, Aberdeenshire, Scotland, the son of Patricia (a nurse) and Charles Mullan (a lab technician at Glasgow University). The seventh of eight children, Mullan was brought up in a working class Roman Catholic family. They later moved to Mosspark, a district in Glasgow. An alcoholic, Mullan's father became increasingly tyrannical and abusive; he died from lung cancer when Mullan was 17. For a brief period, Mullan was a member of a street gang while at secondary school, and worked as a bouncer in a number of south-side pubs. He was homeless for short periods at the ages of 15 and 18.

Career
Mullan went on to the University of Glasgow to study economic history and drama. There, he began acting and continued stage acting after graduation. He had roles in films such as Shallow Grave, Trainspotting, Braveheart and Riff-Raff. Mullan's role as a recovering alcoholic in My Name Is Joe won him the Best Actor Award at the 1998 Cannes Film Festival.

His first full-length film, Orphans, won an award at the Venice Film Festival. In 2002, he returned to directing and screenwriting with the controversial film The Magdalene Sisters, based on life in an Irish Magdalene asylum. Mullan won a Golden Lion award at the Venice Film Festival.

Mullan appeared in the 2021 miniseries The North Water and The Underground Railroad. He also starred in the Amazon Prime Video series The Lord of the Rings: The Rings of Power, which premiered in 2022.

Personal life

Mullan married Ann Swan, an actress and scriptwriter, in 1989; they divorced in 2006. He has four children – three with Swan and one with former girlfriend, activist Robina Qureshi.

A self-described Marxist, Mullan continues to support socialist causes and was a leading figure in the left-wing theatre movement that blossomed in Scotland during the Conservative Thatcher government. These included stints with the 7:84 and Wildcat Theatre companies. An outspoken critic of Tony Blair's New Labour government, he told The Guardian "the TUC and the Labour Party sold us [the working class] out big style, unashamedly so". Ahead of the 1999 Scottish Parliament election, Mullan pledged support for the newly-formed Scottish Socialist Party and their leader Tommy Sheridan. Mullan took part in a 2006 occupation of the Glasgow offices of the UK Immigration Service, protesting against the UKIS's "dawn raid" tactics when deporting failed asylum seekers.

In January 2009, Mullan joined other actors in protesting against the BBC's refusal to screen a Disasters Emergency Committee appeal for Gaza. They told BBC director general Mark Thompson: "Like millions of others, we are absolutely appalled at the decision to refuse to broadcast the appeal. We will never work for the BBC again unless this disgraceful decision is reversed. We will urge others from our profession and beyond to do likewise." Mullan has agreed to appear in an adaptation of Iain Banks' novel Stonemouth after the BBC aired a DEC appeal for Gaza in late 2014.

Mullan was a supporter of the Yes Scotland campaign in the 2014 Scottish independence referendum. In 2015, he criticised the BBC for "horrendous bias" against the Yes campaign and told the Radio Times that "to see the BBC used as a political cudgel against a legitimate democratic movement ... really broke my heart."

Filmography

Film

Television

References

External links

1959 births
Living people
20th-century Scottish male actors
21st-century Scottish male actors
Alumni of the University of Glasgow
British Marxists
Cannes Film Festival Award for Best Actor winners
Directors of Golden Lion winners
Male actors from Glasgow
People from Peterhead
Scottish film directors
Scottish male film actors
Scottish male television actors
Scottish male voice actors
Scottish nationalists
Scottish people of Irish descent
Scottish screenwriters